Glipa fasciata is a species of beetle in the genus Glipa.

The species was described by Kôno in 1928.

References 

fasciata
Beetles described in 1928